Göztepe S.K. Handball Team is the professional handball team of Göztepe S.K., which is a Turkish sports club from Izmir. The club plays their home matches at Celal Atik Spor Salonu.

European record

Current squad
Squad for the 2016–17 season

Goalkeepers
 0  Mohsen Babasafari Renani
 85  Aliaksandr Markelau
 99  Alp Yildiz
Right Wingers
 21  Nevzat Kerem Direk
 5  Murat Enc
Left Wingers
 3  Enis Harun Hacioglu
 2  Aleksandar Pilipovic
 42  Kürsat Alim Us
Line players
 4  Cenk Köker
 8  Erdogan Sürer
 23  Nemanja Vucicevic

Left Backs
 19  Baran Nalbantoglu
 43  Burakcan Öztürk
Central Backs
 7  Evgeny Semenov
 53  Yakup Yasar Simsar
Right Backs
 11  Milos Lojanicic
 17  Gökhan Örnek

References

External links
 EHF Challenge Cup website 
 Official website 

Göztepe S.K.
Sports teams in İzmir
Turkish handball clubs